Heo Chang-beom (born 17 December 1940) is a South Korean weightlifter. He competed in the men's middleweight event at the 1964 Summer Olympics.

References

1940 births
Living people
South Korean male weightlifters
Olympic weightlifters of South Korea
Weightlifters at the 1964 Summer Olympics
Place of birth missing (living people)
20th-century South Korean people